Eddie Fields (born January 21, 1967) is an American politician from Oklahoma. A Republican, Fields served as a member of the Oklahoma House of Representatives from 2008 to 2010, and on the Oklahoma Senate between 2010 and 2018. He announced his unsuccessful candidacy for Lieutenant Governor of Oklahoma in 2018.

Early life and career
Fields holds a Bachelor of Science degree in Agri-Business from Oklahoma State University. Prior to his political career, Fields worked as a cattle rancher and a businessman.

Political career
Fields contested the 2006 legislative elections, and lost to Scott Bighorse. He defeated Bighorse in 2008, and became the only candidate during that election cycle to unseat an incumbent Oklahoma state representative.  Fields formally took office on November 18, 2008, and served as a member of the Oklahoma House of Representatives until 2010. He ran for election to the Oklahoma Senate from district 10 in 2010, representing Osage, Pawnee, Kay, Payne, and Tulsa counties, and won. He defeated David McLain in the Republican Party primary, then faced Dale Christenson Jr. in the general election. His 2014 reelection bid was uncontested. In the Senate he had focused on applying his agricultural experience towards law-making. While in office, he has voted in favor of repealing the state income tax and restricting abortions. He serves as Chairman of the Senate Agriculture and Rural Development Committee, Vice-Chair of the Appropriations Subcommittee on Natural Resources and Regulatory Services, and as a member of the Tourism and Wildlife, Energy, and Rules committees.

Fields was one of four Republican candidates to seek the office of Lieutenant Governor of Oklahoma in 2018.

References

External links
 Eddie Fields at Ballotpedia

Living people
Republican Party Oklahoma state senators
1967 births
21st-century American politicians
Ranchers from Oklahoma
Candidates in the 2018 United States elections